Chand may refer to:

Chand (name), as a given name, a middle name and as a surname
Chand Kings, a medieval Rajput ruling clan 
Chaand Raat, the eve of the Muslim festival of Eid ul-Fitr
Chand, a demon slain by Parvati
Chand, a village in Chhindwara District, Madhya Pradesh state, India, admin centre for Chand Tehsil
Chand (film), 1959 Hindi film
Chand, a village in Sialkot District, Tehsil Pasrur, Pakistan,

See also

 Sri Chand, Sikh ascetic and founder of Udasi